David Rooney may refer to:

 David Rooney (cricketer) (born 1975), English cricketer
 David Rooney (Gaelic footballer) (born 1990), Gaelic footballer for Sligo

See also
 Dave Rooney (1937–2006), teacher and politician